Wanderers (Irish: Fánaithe Bhaile Baodáin) are a Gaelic Athletic Association club located in Ballyboden, Dublin, Ireland.

Background
Ballyboden Wanderers G.A.A. Club was founded in 1910. They played their first match against Clanna Gael Fontenoys in April 1910. The match was played by permission of Padraig Mac Piarais in the grounds of Scoil Eanna, Grange Road Rathfarnham. The club won the inaugural Dublin Junior Football Championship in 1928.

The club disbanded in 1932 and while there some fixtures played in the intervening years, it was not officially reformed until 1961. After winning the Dublin Junior Football Championship in 1968, under the captaincy of Seán Doherty, the Ballyboden Club amalgamated with Rathfarnham St. Enda's in order to join the senior ranks under the name Ballyboden St. Enda's

In 1980, a group of breakaway members formed Wanderers. Since then, the club has gone from strength to strength, now fielding numerous football teams and juvenile hurling teams, catering for anyone between the ages of 4 and adulthood. The club boasts  of ground incorporating two playing pitches, and a training area at the panoramic Frank Kelly Park, which was officially opened by former Dublin County Secretary, Mr. Jim King (R.I.P.) in 1991.

Major Events in the Club's History

The opening of Frank Kelly Park in 1991 was a milestone in the club's development. It was also significant because it occurred while our eminent Club President Frank Kelly was still alive, making our grounds the first to be dedicated in tribute to a living member of the association, though in breach of the official GAA Rules.
 
Frank had given a lifetime of service to the club. He died in 1995.

The turning of the first sod of their new clubhouse development, which was performed by Minister Tom Kitt in March 1998, heralded a new era for the club. The clubhouse was officially opened early in 1999.

In 2006 Wanderers opened the latest phase of their development. This included a meeting room and a weights room.

Another major event took place on 29 October 2011 when a group of U-7's took part in the club's first ever Hurling training session in preparation for entering an U-8 league in 2012.

Eminent members

Frank Kelly was the father of Wanderers. He was held in such high esteem by all of the members, that the grounds were named after him. Frank was noted for his kindness and thoughtfulness, and used to provide all members with home grown shamrocks for St. Patrick's Day.

Sean Doherty who is now a club trustee is perhaps our most famous member. Having captained us to Junior Championship victory in 1968, Sean later captained Heffo's Army to two All-Ireland Senior Football Championships. He now owns a bar and restaurant adjacent to our grounds at Rockbrook, Rathfarnham. Many G.A.A. members visit the hostelry, which displays many relics and memorabilia from the decade of the Dubs.

Jim Mannion our former club chairman played inter-county senior football for his native Galway, and was a member of the all-conquering Dunmore McHales club before he won a Dublin Junior Championship with Ballyboden Wanderers in 1968. Jim is currently club treasurer.

Jim Kearns who was a nephew of Frank Kelly, was synonymous with our club since 1961. He was a member of the executive committee all his life and worked tirelessly as secretary for many years. Jim was club treasurer at the time of his death in September 2006

Jersey Colours

The club has a distinctive black jersey with a red band, black shorts and black socks with red and white trimmings. The club's alternative jersey is red with a black band. The club tracksuit is black with red and white trimmings.

Club Crest

The new crest features the Whitechurch Carnegie Library at Taylor's Lane. The Library was built in 1910 and has been synonymous with the club ever since. Generations of Wanderers players have assembled outside the library before matches, while the club committee has met there every Thursday for many years prior to the opening of our oun clubhouse. Many club social events including card-playing, Irish-dancing and quizzes have also been hosted there. The Hell Fire Club at the summit of Mount Pelier is in the backdrop, while the blue coloured foreground symbolises the Owendoher and Little Dargle River which are boundaries of the Ballyboden parish. The triangular shape of the crest is significant as it symbolises a modern club built on strong foundations, embracing all sections of the local community and striving for the summit of Dublin Football. It mirrors the G.A.A. Coaching Emblem, which is considered a high priority in the club. And of course triangles are very prominent in the elevation of the Carnegie Library and the club's new social centre at Frank Kelly Park.

Catchment Area

The vast majority of the club's 600 members were born or reside in Ballyboden, which is a large parish at the foothills of the Dublin mountains. All of the club's juvenile players attend the local primary and secondary schools. While the club has concentrated mainly on the promotion of Gaelic football, with considerable success at juvenile level, members are also involved in many social and cultural activities, as the club has become a focal point for the community.

Location and Buildings

The club's headquarters are at Frank Kelly Park, Mount Venus Road, Rockbrook, Rathfarnham, Dublin 16. There are two playing pitches, a training ground, and a new 250 square metre clubhouse.

The club also use pitches at Scoil Mhuire school, Ballyboden.

Current teams
Junior A men's Football
Junior B men's Football.
Junior ladies Football.
U8s boys / girls (Football, Hurling/Camogie)
U9s boys / girls (Football, Hurling/Camogie)
U11 boys (Football and Hurling)
U12 girls (Football)
U14 boys (Football and Hurling)
U14 girls (Football)

Roll of honour

Adult

Dublin Junior Football Championships: 2
 1928, 1968
Dublin Junior 2 Football Championships: 1
 2020
   
 Dublin Junior B Football Championship runner-up 
 2016
 Plant Cup
 1967
 Dublin Conlon Cup 4
 1968, 1999, 2002, 2011
 Dublin AFL Div 6
 2005
 Dublin AFL Div 7
 2016
 Dublin AFL Div. 10S  (section) 
 2013
 Dublin AFL Div 11 South
 2011
 Dublin AFL Div. 12 
 2009
 Dublin Ladies Junior F Football Championship: 2
 2008, 2018
 Dublin Ladies Junior E
Football Championship ''' 1
 2019.

Notable former players
Senior inter-county men's footballers
 Dublin 
 Seán Doherty
Senior inter-county ladies' footballers
 
 Nicola Daly
 women's field hockey internationals
 Nicola Daly
 Alison Meeke

External links
 
Official Ballyboden Wanderers Facebook

Wanderers
Gaelic games clubs in South Dublin (county)
Rathfarnham